Steven R. King (born 1968 in Victoria) is a former Australian jockey who is best known for riding Let's Elope to victory in the 1991 Melbourne Cup.

He was awarded the Scobie Breasley Medal for 1997.

King retired in 2016 having ridden 54 Group 1 winners.

Notable wins

 Blue Diamond Stakes: Hurricane Sky (1994)
 Caulfield Cup: Let's Elope (1991)
 Cox Plate: Fields of Omagh (2003)
 Hong Kong Sprint: Fairy King Prawn (1999)
 Melbourne Cup: Let's Elope (1991)
 Sydney Cup: Count Chivas (1996)

References

Australian jockeys
Sportsmen from Victoria (Australia)
Living people
1960s births